Student marketing refers to the promotion of products, brands and ideas to the 3 million+ higher and further education student population. Student marketing is generally realised through student media or ambient marketing on campuses.

Student marketing is not the same as Student Union Marketing which concentrates on marketing opportunities only through Student Union, Association and Guild media. This type of media is powered through companies who provide media services for student union bodies as well as the production of their newspapers and website systems. Youth marketing companies that influence student buying behaviour and motivate student spending utilise a variety of mediums and marketing channels to effectively talk to the youth.

Marketing material directed at students must overcome several problems: they have little money; they are a transient population who will soon graduate, cease to be students, and possibly move away; and they tend to be a skeptical audience critical towards marketing messages and fake attempts to be cool.

However students are also an attractive market: while they do have a restricted budget many are living away from home and are therefore making independent choices over which brands to buy for the very first time. Hence they are often excited about making purchases that would be mundane for older consumers. Attracting students at this time has huge long run brand loyalty effects. University students also make an ideal target market for internet-based companies. Over 99% of students are comfortable using the internet, going online at least once a week, although usually every day. They also don’t have the same fear of the internet as much of the general population, particularly when it comes to purchasing goods online – average online spend is 7 times higher than that of the general population. Finally, whilst the working population uses the internet predominantly for work purposes, two-thirds of the time that students spend online is general surfing.

When it comes to targeting, students have in the past been considered an elusive group, with much of their time taken up on campus and through socialising. Traditional forms of advertising, such as mainstream radio, TV and billboard advertising campaigns, are not ideal channels for reaching today’s students. Therefore, other media are targeted, such as smartphone advertising and social media. Equally, marketers can take advantage of students' concentration at geographical locations (colleges) and use techniques such as campus visits and college street teams.

United Kingdom
Students in the UK are estimated to spend over £13 billion a year, making them a key market for consumer brands.

With the growth and development of the internet, campaigns have vastly diversified and now include multiple elements from traditional on-campus activity to bluetooth, Adwalkers, email, sms, online and social media. Leading youth brands such as the BBC, Burger King, O2, Red Bull, Virgin, to name a few, are actively engaging with the UK student market through agencies and media channels who produce the official universities welcome parcels directly into the student bedrooms.

A leading factor in the diversification of the market has been the rapid growth in the size of the student market in the UK over recent years, with 1.8 million students now in Higher Education Programmes. 
 
With a combined spending power of more than £10 billion and an average student spending over £5,000 each year the student market can be a highly lucrative one. Students are certainly the most profitable group of 18- to 24-year-olds.

Some UK universities have moved to ban advertising they consider harmful to students, such as for payday loan companies.

United States
Certain agencies have focused on advertising to college students, such as Student Advantage, which operated a membership-card based program in the 1990s and moved into the internet, and which in 1998 bought rival Collegiate Advantage. Other online services such as Student Beans and StudentUniverse provide students with access to student discounts from various retailers and brands. US universities spent $1.6 B in advertising in 2016. This amount is for bachelors and Graduate programs.

References

Promotion and marketing communications
Students
Marketing by target group